Skalleluia Too! is the fourth full-length album by the Christian ska band, The Insyderz. Released on 26 October 1999, it is the second of their albums dedicated to ska renditions of worship songs. It offers a greater variety of musical influences when compared to Skalleluia!.

Track listing

Personnel
Joe Yerke - Lead Vocals
Kyle Wasil - Lead Guitar
Beau McCarthy - Bass Guitar
Nate Sjogren - Drums, Percussion, Vibraphone, Vocals
Bram Roberts - Trumpet
Chris Colonnier - Trombone

Additional Musicians
Melissa Hasin - Cello
Doug Webb - Saxophone
Chris Rush - Trumpet
Corey Gemme - Cornet

References

The Insyderz albums
1999 albums